A Kiss for Corliss (retitled Almost a Bride before its release) is a 1949 American comedy film directed by Richard Wallace, written by Howard Dimsdale and starring David Niven and Shirley Temple. The film, which was the last for both Wallace and Temple, was released on November 25, 1949 by United Artists. It is a sequel to the 1945 film Kiss and Tell, also directed by Wallace and starring Temple.

Plot
Playboy Kenneth Marquis is divorcing his third wife, who is represented by her attorney, Harry Archer. Corliss, Archer's teenaged daughter, is smitten with the charismatic Marquis and his free-wheeling lifestyle. Marquis sends a box of candy to Corliss, infuriating Archer, who interprets the gift as a jab at his settlement demand. Archer also prohibits Corliss' boyfriend Dexter from dating her after he sees Dexter at the Penguin Club, a restaurant that doubles as a gambling joint. Corliss manipulates Dexter into taking her to the club, but just after they arrive, the club is raided by police. Corliss and Dexter hide in the basement but are temporarily trapped, causing Corliss to arrive home late, so she feigns amnesia to her parents to cover the truth. To refresh Corliss' memory, Archer reads her diary, which contains her imaginary romantic trysts with Marquis. The contents of the diary, along with Marquis' gift of candy, cause Corliss' parents to assume the worst.

Corliss' friend Raymond Pringle, who publishes a neighborhood paper, shows Marquis some of the diary entries, threatening to publish them unless Marquis buys advertising. Marquis visits the Archers and says that every word in the diary is true, that he is in love with Corliss and that he wants to make her his fourth wife. When Archer explodes in anger, Corliss admits that the diary is not true and was written to make Dexter jealous. Marquis insists that the diary is true even though Corliss reveals why she was out late. Dexter arrives and eventually agrees with Corliss' version of events, but the Archers remain unconvinced. Marquis announces his engagement to Corliss in the newspaper in order to sue the Archers for breach of promise when the engagement is canceled. The Archers delay rescinding the engagement to avoid the appearance of an immediate breach.

Marquis has gifts for Corliss delivered, and Archer is hounded by the media. Corliss continues to insist that the diary is false to her parents' continuing disbelief. Glimpse, a national magazine, runs photos of Marquis and Corliss. Archer's brother Uncle George, a Navy chaplain, visits and offers to perform the wedding. At the wedding rehearsal, held in the Archers' home, Dexter tells Mr. Archer that he has a witness who can attest to his and Corliss' version of the events from the night when she was out late. Marquis' lie is revealed and the men escort him outside, where an offscreen fight ensues, and Archer and Dexter both return bloodied. Archer had overcome Marquis in the fight, but Dexter had accidentally hit  Archer. Marquis passes by an open window, his eye blackened, and mocks Archer and Dexter as he departs.

Cast
 Shirley Temple as Corliss Archer
 David Niven as Kenneth Marquis
 Tom Tully as Harry P. Archer
 Virginia Welles as Mildred Pringle
 Darryl Hickman as Dexter Franklin
 Gloria Holden as Mrs. Janet Archer
 Robert Ellis as Raymond Pringle
 Kathryn Card as Louise
 Richard Gaines as Taylor
 Roy Roberts as Uncle George

References

External links

 
 
 
 

1949 films
1949 comedy films
American black-and-white films
American comedy films
American sequel films
Films directed by Richard Wallace
United Artists films
1940s English-language films
1940s American films